The Royal Dutch Chess Federation ( - KNSB) is the national organization for chess in the Netherlands. It is affiliated with the World Chess Federation. Its headquarters are in Haarlem. The current president is Bianca de Jong-Muhren.

The Royal Dutch Chess Federation was founded in 1873 and is one of the country's oldest sports federations. It organizes a Dutch Chess Championship and initiatives such as a Chess Challenge in secondary schools.

Administration 
Current officers of the Royal Dutch Chess Federation are:
 president: Marleen van Amerongen 
 secretary: Arthur Rongen 
 treasurer: Michiel Bosnan

The board also includes representatives of the ten regional organizations subordinate to the federation. Mark van der Werf directs the head office.

Presidents

Dutch chess players 
 Jan Hein Donner 
 Max Euwe, president of the Royal Dutch Federation (1943-1945) and president of the World Chess Federation (1970-1977), world champion 
 Dick Tommel, president of the Royal Dutch Chess Federation
 Jan Timman, a Dutch chess Grandmaster who was one of the world's leading players from the late 1970s to the early 1990s.

References

Further reading
 Hans Ree et al. Nederland schaakt! KNSB 100 jaar. Baarn: Moussault, 1974.  
 Hans Scholten. 'Het loopt ongenadiglijk mat'. Het schaakleven in Nederland in de negentiende eeuw. De sociaal-culturele achtergrond van het ontstaan van schaakverenigingen. Bilthoven: Scholten, 1999. . (Thesis, Catholic University of Brabant, 1999).

External links
 

Netherlands
Chess in the Netherlands
Chess
1873 establishments in the Netherlands
Sports organizations established in 1873
Chess organizations
1873 in chess
Organisations based in the Netherlands with royal patronage